Bryant T. Scofield (October 26, 1823 – March 19, 1881) was a lawyer and politician from Illinois.

Early life
Bryant T. Scofield was born on October 26, 1823, in Dewittville, New York, to Sally (née Glenny) and Darius Scofield. He was of English ancestry. In 1843, Scofield moved to Hancock County, Illinois, and became a teacher. He entered the office of William A. Richardson in Rushville, Illinois, and was admitted to the bar in 1846.

Career
In 1846, Scofield moved to Carthage, Illinois, to start a law practice. Around 1863, Scofield became a lawyer for railroad companies as they merged into the Chicago, Burlington and Quincy Railroad.

In 1862, Scofield was elected to the Illinois Senate. He served for four years.

Personal life
Scofield married Sarah A. Collins, who was of Scottish ancestry, on September 11, 1848. They had eight children: Glenn W., Mrs. J. M. Cromer, Julia L., Ralph E., Edward B., Frank, Charles and Timothy. His brother was Glenni William Scofield.

Scofield died on March 19, 1881, in Carthage.

References

1823 births
1881 deaths
People from Chautauqua, New York
Illinois lawyers
Illinois state senators
People from Carthage, Illinois
19th-century American politicians